Acmaeodera xanthosticta is a species of metallic wood-boring beetle in the family Buprestidae. It is found in the Caribbean Sea, North America, and South America.

References

Further reading

 
 
 

xanthosticta
Articles created by Qbugbot
Beetles described in 1835